The salinosporamides are a group of closely related chemical compounds isolated from marine bacteria in the genus Salinispora.  They possess a densely functionalized γ-lactam-β-lactone bicyclic core.

Salinosporamide A has attracted interest for its potential use in treating various types of cancer.

In addition, a variety of synthetic analogs have been prepared.

Chemical structures

References

External links
 

Natural products
Lactams
Lactones